Thomas Mason is a Canadian-American condensed-matter physicist who serves as the director of Los Alamos National Laboratory. Prior to this appointment, he had been an executive at Battelle Memorial Institute from 2017 to 2018, and the director of Oak Ridge National Laboratory from 2007 to 2017.  Mason moved to Oak Ridge in 1998 at the start of construction of the Spallation Neutron Source which he led from 2001 until project completion in 2006.

Early life 
Mason was born in Dartmouth, Nova Scotia, in Halifax, Nova Scotia, Canada. His father was a geophysicist who worked at the Bedford Institute of Oceanography, and his mother a biochemist, was working at Dalhousie University in Halifax.

In 1986, Mason received his Bachelor in Science from Dalhousie University. In 1990, Mason received his doctorate in physics from McMaster University. In 1997, Mason was listed on Maclean's 100 Canadians To Watch list for his work in neutron scattering research. At the time, he was an associate professor in physics at the University of Toronto.

Career
Mason started his career in the United States as the science director of the Spallation Neutron Source project in 1998. In 2007, Mason became the director of Oak Ridge National Laboratory, succeeding Dr. Jeffrey Wadsworth as the lab's 14th director. He stepped down from the position in 2017 to serve as the senior vice president for laboratory operations at Battelle Memorial Institute.

Mason became director at Los Alamos as part of the new Triad National Security LLC management team. In June, 2018, the National Nuclear Security Administration, headed by Lisa Gordon-Hagerty, announced that it had awarded an agency, called Triad National Security LLC,  the $25 billion contract for security of the Los Alamos National Laboratory. Triad replaced the former Los Alamos National Security. The announcement of this action occurred on June 8, with notice to proceed on July 5, 2018. The contract includes a five-year base with five one-year options, for a total of 10 years if all options are exercised. With this contract came the appointment of Mason on November 1, 2018.

References

21st-century American physicists
Canadian condensed matter physicists
Los Alamos National Laboratory personnel
American people of Canadian descent
Oak Ridge National Laboratory people
Living people
McMaster University alumni
Dalhousie University alumni
Battelle Memorial Institute
1964 births
American condensed matter physicists